Saul Leiter  (December 3, 1923 – November 26, 2013) was an American photographer and painter whose early work in the 1940s and 1950s was an important contribution to what came to be recognized as the New York school of photography.

Life and work
Saul Leiter was born in Pittsburgh, Pennsylvania. His father was a well known Talmud scholar and Saul studied to become a rabbi. His mother gave him his first camera at age 12. At age 23, he left theology school and moved to New York City to become an artist. He had developed an early interest in painting and was fortunate to meet the Abstract Expressionist painter Richard Pousette-Dart.

Pousette-Dart and W. Eugene Smith encouraged Leiter to pursue photography and he was soon taking black and white pictures with a 35 mm Leica, which he acquired for a few Eugene Smith prints. In 1948, he started taking color photographs. He began associating with other contemporary photographers such as Robert Frank and Diane Arbus and helped form what Jane Livingston has termed the New York School of photographers during the 1940s and 1950s.

Leiter worked as a fashion photographer for the next 20 years and was published in Show, Elle, British Vogue, Queen, and Nova. In the late 1950s the art director Henry Wolf published Leiter’s color fashion work in Esquire and later in Harper’s Bazaar.

Edward Steichen included Leiter’s black and white photographs in the exhibition Always the Young Stranger at the Museum of Modern Art in 1953. Leiter’s work is featured prominently in Jane Livingston’s book The New York School (1992) and in Martin Harrison’s Appearances: Fashion Photography since 1945 (1991). In 2008, The Henri Cartier-Bresson Foundation in Paris mounted Leiter's first museum exhibition in Europe with an accompanying catalog.

Leiter is the subject of a 2012 feature-length documentary In No Great Hurry - 13 Lessons in Life with Saul Leiter, directed and produced by Tomas Leach. Leiter is a featured subject, among others, in the documentary film Tracing Outlines (2015) by 2nd State Productions.

Martin Harrison, editor and author of Saul Leiter Early Color (2006), writes, "Leiter’s sensibility . . . placed him outside the visceral confrontations with urban anxiety associated with photographers such as Robert Frank or William Klein. Instead, for him the camera provided an alternate way of seeing, of framing events and interpreting reality. He sought out moments of quiet humanity in the Manhattan maelstrom, forging a unique urban pastoral from the most unlikely of circumstances."

Leiter died on 26 November 2013 in New York City.

Publications
Early Color. Introduction by Martin Harrison.
Göttingen: Steidl, 2006. .
Göttingen: Steidl, 2013. .
Saul Leiter.
Paris: Delpire, 2007. Photo Poche series.
London: Thames & Hudson, 2008. . Photofile series.
Early Black and White.
Göttingen: Steidl, 2008.
Göttingen: Steidl; Howard Greenberg Gallery, 2014. . Two volumes, boxed edition. By Max Kozloff, edited by Howard Greenberg and Bob Shamis with the assistance of Margit Erb, with an additional essay by Jane Livingston.
Saul Leiter. Göttingen: Steidl, 2008. . Preface by Agnès Sire.
Photographs and Works on Paper. Antwerp: Fifty One Publication, 2011. . Exhibition Catalogue.
Here's more, why not?. Antwerp: Fifty One Publication, 2013. .
Painted Nudes. London: Sylph, 2015. .
All About Saul Leiter. Seigensha, 2017. Catalogue published to accompany an exhibition at the Bunkamura Museum of Art, Tokyo, 2017. Captions in English and Japanese. 
Women. Tokyo: Space Shower, 2018. . Mostly photographs, some paintings.

Solo exhibitions

1944: Ten Thirty Gallery, Cleveland.
1945: The Outlines Gallery, Pittsburgh.
1947: Butler Institute of American Art, Youngstown, OH.
1950s: Tanager Gallery, New York.
1954: Emerging Talent. Curated by Clement Greenberg. Samuel Koontz Gallery, New York.
1972: Midtown Y, New York.
1984: Gallery Lafayette, New York.
1985: Gallery Lafayette, New York.
1993: Howard Greenberg Gallery, New York.
1994: Howard Greenberg Gallery, New York.
1997: Saul Leiter, In Color. Martha Schneider Gallery, Chicago.
1997: Saul Leiter, In Color. Howard Greenberg Gallery, New York.
2004: Saul Leiter, In Color. Staton Greenberg Gallery, Santa Barbara.
2005: Saul Leiter, Early Color. Howard Greenberg Gallery, New York.
2006: The Fashion Photographs of Saul Leiter, Festival of Fashion Photography, Hyères, France.
2006: Saul Leiter, Color, Fifty One Fine Art Photography, Antwerp.
2006: In Living Color, Photographs by Saul Leiter, Milwaukee Art Museum.
2007: Saul Leiter, Early Color, University of Maine Museum of Art, Bangor.
2008: Saul Leiter, Galerie Camera Obscura, Paris.
2008: Saul Leiter, Faggionato Fine Arts, London.
2008: Saul Leiter, Howard Greenberg Gallery, New York.
2008: Saul Leiter, Jackson Fine Art, Atlanta.
2008: Saul Leiter, Galleria C arla Sozzani, Milan.
2008: Saul Leiter, Foundation Henri Cartier-Bresson, Paris.
2009: Saul Leiter, Fifty One Fine Art Photography, Antwerp.
2010: Saul Leiter, Mois de la Foto, Paris.
2011: Saul Leiter, New York Reflections, Jewish Historical Museum, Amsterdam.
2011: Saul Leiter, Early Color, Musée de l’Elysée, Lausanne
2011: Saul Leiter, Photographs and works on paper, Fifty One Fine Art Photography, Antwerp.
2012: Saul Leiter, Retrospective, Deichtorhallen Hamburg.
2013: Saul Leiter, Here's more, why not, Fifty One Fine Art Photography, Antwerp.
2013: Saul Leiter, Black & white, Fifty One Fine Art Photography, Antwerp.
2013: Saul Leiter, Kunst Haus Wien.
2015: Homage to Saul Leiter, Fifty One gallery, Antwerp.

Collections

Leiter's work is held in the following public collections:
 Addison Gallery of American Art
 The Albertina Museum, Vienna
 Amon Carter Museum, Fort Worth
 Art Institute of Chicago
 Baltimore Museum of Art, Baltimore
 Milwaukee Art Museum
 Museum of Fine Arts, Boston
 Museum of Fine Arts, Houston
 Museum of Modern Art, New York
 National Gallery of Art, Washington, D.C.
 St. Louis Art Museum, St. Louis
 Staatliche Museen Zu Berlin,
 Victoria & Albert Museum, London
 Whitney Museum of American Arts, New York

References

External links
 
 Saul Leiter Early Black and White Photo Book The Eye of Photography
 Saul Leiter interview at Photographers Speak
 18 photographs by Saul Leiter
 In No Great Hurry, a feature documentary about Saul Leiter by Tomas Leach
 'Coffee and conversation with photographer Saul Leiter' in 2008 by Visual Productions NYC

1923 births
2013 deaths
Artists from Pittsburgh
Photographers from Pennsylvania
American people of Jewish descent